Cibotium schiedei, common name Mexican tree fern, is a species of tree fern, of the genus Cibotium.

Etymology
The genus name Cibotium is derived from the Greek kibootion, meaning chest or box, while the epithet schiedei honors the German physician and botanist Christian Julius Wilhelm Schiede (1798–1836).

Description
It is a very slow growing tree fern, usually with a prostrate trunk covered with hairs. The light green fronds have quite elongated pinnae.

Distribution and habitat

References 

schiedei
Endemic flora of Mexico